Jane Huang (Puyuma: Alines, ; born 19 January 1983) is a Taiwanese singer. She was born in Taitung County, Taiwan. She is a member of Taiwan's Puyuma aboriginal people. In 2007, she finished seventh in the One Million Star Taiwanese singing competition. With the strong support of her fans, she became the popular vote winner. She is currently in the band Y2J with band member Yuming Lai.

References 

1983 births
Living people
Puyuma people
People from Taitung County
One Million Star contestants
21st-century Taiwanese singers
21st-century Taiwanese women singers